The 2017–18 season is Oldham Athletic's 123rd season in their history and 21st consecutive season in League One. Along with competing in League One, the club will also participate in the FA Cup, EFL Cup and EFL Trophy.

The season covers the period from 1 July 2017 to 30 June 2018.

Transfers

Transfers in

Transfers out

Loans in

Loans out

Competitions

Friendlies
As of 28 June 2017, Oldham Athletic have announced seven pre-season friendlies against Curzon Ashton, Stalybridge Celtic, Accrington Stanley, Salisbury, Swindon Town, Girona and Manchester United U/23.

League One

League table

Result summary

Result by matchday

Matches
On 21 June 2017, the league fixtures were announced.

FA Cup
On 16 October 2017, Oldham Athletic were drawn away to Carlisle United in the first round.

EFL Cup
On 16 June 2017, Oldham Athletic were drawn at home to Burton Albion in the first round.

EFL Trophy
On 12 July 2017, the group stage draw was completed with Oldham facing Crewe Alexandra, Newcastle United U23s and Port Vale in Northern Group D.

References

Oldham Athletic
Oldham Athletic A.F.C. seasons